Season one of Mexico's Next Top Model, the Mexican adaptation of Tyra Banks' America's Next Top Model, aired on Sony Entertainment Television from October 2009 to December 2009. The show was hosted by Mexican model Elsa Benítez, with a judging panel composed of photographer Allan Fis, TV personality Jo Lance, and former model Glenda Reyna.

The prize package for this season included a US $100,000 contract with Shock Modeling management, a cover feature and  an editorial spread in Glamour magazine, and trips to San Francisco and London sponsored by Sedal.

The winner of the competition was 18-year-old Mariana Bayón from Coahuila.

Cast

Contestants
(Ages stated are at start of contest)

Judges
 Elsa Benítez (host) 
 Allan Fis  
 Jo Lance 
 Glenda Reyna

Other cast members
 Óscar Madrazo - creative director

Episodes

Results

 The contestant was eliminated
 The contestant won the competition

Episode 2 : Makeover Result In Traditional Cruise At Ha Long Bay With Tresemmé 

Episode 3 : Hermes Fashion In Group

Episode 4 : Maybelline It Girl Feminim Style Photoshoot

Episode 5 : Love Story Theater Performance With subaru in Glamour style

Episode 6 : Dramatic And Fierces Zalora Fashion With A Deers 

Episode 7 : Action Film With Subaru

Episode 8 : Kawasaki Browsure Like A Motorcycle Gangster

Episode 9 : Beauty Shoot In Nature Red Lotus Lake With Neutrogena

Episode 10 : Hoi Anh Traditional Culture Shoot In Cinematic With Canon Camera

Episode 11 : Medieval Civilization

Episode 12 : Dessert Tribe High Fashion Couture With Harper Bazaar

Episode 14 : Popular Festivals Around The Worlds

Notes

References

External links
 Official website (archive at the Wayback Machine)

Mexico's Next Top Model
2009 Mexican television seasons